Deakin Stadium is an association football ground located in the south-central Canberra suburb of Deakin, ACT. It is the home ground of Canberra Croatia FC in the NPL ACT.

Primary Use

Canberra FC are the primary tenants of Deakin Stadium. Canberra FC play home matches in the National Premier Leagues Capital Football at the stadium as well Capital Football Federation Cup matches.

Events History

2016 Canberra Olympic FFA Cup run
During 2016 the stadium was used by local ACT NPL club Canberra Olympic for their FFA Cup run. Olympic played their round of 32, round of 16 and quarter-final matches at the stadium before moving to Viking Park in Tuggeranong for their semi-final match against A-league side Sydney FC. The quarter final match was played on 27 September 2016 against Victorian NPL side Green Gully SC. The match attracted a crowd of 2,039 as Olympic pulled off a historic victory with a penalty conversion in the 95th minute of the match giving the home side a 1-0 victory.

2015 Asian Cup

Deakin Stadium was selected  as one of three venues to be used as a training venue as part of the 2015 Asian Cup in the ACT along with host venue Canberra Stadium and the second training venue McKellar Park. The stadium received an upgrade to its lighting as part of the $650,000 ACT facility upgrade fund for the tournament. South Korea was the primary team that used Deakin Stadium for closed training sessions during the tournament while they were base in Canberra.

Canberra United FC

Deakin Stadium is used as an alternative venue for Canberra's W-League team. Canberra United. United normally play at McKellar Park in Canberra's north but every now and then they will play a game in Deakin. On 4 December 2010, A match between Canberra United and Adelaide United was abandoned at Deakin Stadium after sixty-eight minutes due to the referee declaring the pitch unplayable following a torrential rain burst. Canberra at the time was 4-0 up in front of 576 souls brave enough to brace the wet conditions. In 2012 Canberra United played two matches at Deakin Stadium on the 5th and 8 December against Perth Glory and Newcastle Jets respectively.

A-League pre-season friendlies

Deakin Stadium has a long standing of hosting pre-season matches between Canberra FC and A-League opposition. The below table details these matches:

Records

Record attendance: 2,782 (Canberra FC vs Canberra Olympic, 11 September 2016, NPL ACT Grand Final).

References

External links

 
 Canberra FC home
 Deakin Croatia FC home
 NPL ACT home
 Capital Football home

Sports venues in Canberra
Soccer venues in Canberra
A-League Women stadiums
Canberra United FC